The 1974 Cupa României Final was the 36th final of Romania's most prestigious football cup competition. It was disputed between Jiul Petroşani and Politehnica Timișoara, and was won by Jiul Petroşani after a game with 6 goals. It was the first cup for Jiul Petroşani.

Match details

See also
List of Cupa României finals

References

External links
Romaniansoccer.ro

1974
Cupa
Romania
FC Politehnica Timișoara matches